The 1962 Nippon Professional Baseball season was the thirteenth season of operation of Nippon Professional Baseball (NPB).

Regular season

Standings

Postseason

Japan Series

League leaders

Central League

Pacific League

Awards
Most Valuable Player
Minoru Murayama, Hanshin Tigers (CL)
Isao Harimoto, Toei Flyers (PL)
Rookie of the Year
Kunio Jonouchi, Yomiuri Giants (CL)
Yukio Ozaki, Toei Flyers (PL)
Eiji Sawamura Award
Masaaki Koyama, Hanshin Tigers (CL)

See also
1962 Major League Baseball season

References